General Secretary Xi Jinping important speech series is a book of statements from speeches by Xi Jinping, the current General Secretary of the Chinese Communist Party, published in 2014 and 2016 and widely distributed during Xi's administration. The book was originally compiled by the Publicity Department of the Chinese Communist Party and published by official People's Publishing House and Study Publishing House. The Organization Department of the Chinese Communist Party has ordered cadres and university students to study the book and learn "the spirit of the General Secretary's speeches."

See also
 Quotations from Chairman Mao Tse-tung
 Xi Jinping's cult of personality
 The Governance of China
 Xi Jinping Thought

References 

Chinese literature
Communist books
People's Republic of China culture
Propaganda books and pamphlets
Ideology of the Chinese Communist Party
Books of quotations
Xi Jinping
2014 non-fiction books
2016 non-fiction books
Works by Xi Jinping